The 2019–20 Botola 2 is the 58th season of Botola 2, the second division of the Moroccan football league.

Teams
 AS Salé
 Chabab Atlas Khénifra
 Chabab Ben Guerir
 Chabab Mohammédia
 Chabab Rif Al Hoceima
 Ittihad Khemisset
 KAC Kénitra
 Kawkab Marrakech
 Maghreb de Fès
 Olympique Dcheira
 Racing de Casablanca
 Riadi Salmi
 Sidi Kacem
 Tihad Casablanca
 Widad Témara
 Wydad de Fès

League table

See also
 2019–20 Botola

External links
 Soccerway

Botola seasons